Dave Buchanan (born April 23, 1948) is a Canadian former all-star and Grey Cup champion running back in the Canadian Football League.

Career 
An all-star with the Arizona State Sun Devils, Buchanan signed with the Cincinnati Bengals in 1971. Instead of staying with their taxi squad, he opted to play in Canada with the Hamilton Tiger-Cats, rushing for 213 yards that season. 1972 was a career year, as he rushed for 1163 yards, caught 25 passes for 275 yards, and scored 7 TDs. He was chosen as a CFL all-star. He topped the season with a victory in the Grey Cup game. Buchanan finished his career with the Winnipeg Blue Bombers in 1974.

Buchanan was assistant head coach and in charge of the running backs for La Salle College Preparatory in Pasadena, California.

References

1948 births
Living people
Arizona State Sun Devils football players
Canadian football running backs
Hamilton Tiger-Cats players
Winnipeg Blue Bombers players
Players of American football from Pasadena, California
Players of Canadian football from Pasadena, California